For information on all San Diego State University sports, see San Diego State Aztecs

The San Diego State Aztecs men's basketball team is the college basketball program that represents San Diego State University, located in San Diego, California. The team currently competes in the Mountain West Conference (MW) and plays its home games at Viejas Arena. The Aztecs began play in 1921 and have been to 15 NCAA Division I tournaments and 6 NIT tournaments since joining NCAA Division I in 1969. The team previously reached 3 NCAA Division II tournaments and 6 NAIA tournaments, winning the latter in 1941. Since joining the Mountain West Conference, the Aztecs have won 7 MW tournament championships and 9 MW regular season titles. Former players who went on to achieve notable success in the NBA include Michael Cage and Kawhi Leonard. Other former players have gone on to achieve their most notable successes in other areas, such as Art Linkletter and Tony Gwynn.

Team history

The Aztecs first began play during the 1921–22 basketball season. The team played that season, as well as the next three, as part of the Southern California Junior College Conference due to proximity to other schools, despite the fact that that SDSU (then known as San Diego Normal School) was not a junior college itself. The Aztecs joined the Southern California Intercollegiate Athletic Conference (SCIAC) in 1926 following a season as an independent, and competed in the NAIA until 1956, when they transitioned to the newly-founded NCAA Division II. They competed in 6 NAIA Men's Basketball Championships. Finishing as runners up in 1939 and in 1940, the Aztecs finally prevailed and won the 1941 NAIA men's basketball tournament. After competing in NCAA Division II from 1956 until 1969 they became an NCAA Division I school in the Fall of 1969. The Aztecs moved from the Pacific Coast Athletic Association (PCAA), which is now known as the Big West Conference, to the Western Athletic Conference (WAC) in 1978. In 1999, the Aztecs left the WAC and became a charter member of the Mountain West Conference. Prior to entering the Mountain West, the team had been to 3 NCAA Division I men's basketball tournaments. During their time in the MWC, the Aztecs have won several conference championships and have been to 9 NCAA tournaments and 4 NIT tournaments.  In the 2010–11 season, the Aztecs were ranked as high as 4th in the nation and won their first ever games in the NCAA tournament, reaching the Sweet Sixteen. Following the 2013–14 season, the team reached its second Sweet Sixteen. In the 2019–20 season, the Aztecs finished with a 30–2 record for their best winning percentage in team history. The team spent 7 straight weeks in the top 5 of both the AP Top 25 and Coaches Poll, finishing the season at #6 in both polls. The 2020 NCAA Division I men's basketball tournament was cancelled at the end of the season due to the COVID-19 pandemic. In the 2022-2023 season, the Aztecs reached their third Sweet Sixteen.

Rivalries
The Aztecs have three major rivalries, the UNLV Rebels, the USD Toreros, and the BYU Cougars. Their primary rival is the UNLV Rebels, especially in recent years with some memorable showdowns. The USD Toreros are the Aztecs' crosstown rivals and play them near-annually in the City Championship. The Aztecs' rivalry with the BYU Cougars has been partially dormant since 2011, when the Cougars left the MWC for the WCC. The teams still play occasionally in non-conference games.

Facilities

Viejas Arena at Aztec Bowl
The Aztecs play their home games at Viejas Arena (formerly Cox Arena), which is located on the west side of campus on the footprint of the former Aztec Bowl, where SDSU football played its home games from 1935 to 1966. Viejas Arena opened in 1997 as Cox Arena and seats 12,414 for basketball games. In 2009, the Viejas Band of Kumeyaay Indians purchased the naming rights for ten years. The arena features an octagonal scoreboard with video-replay system, that includes up-to-the-minute statistical information on individual players.  The facility is also equipped with seven locker rooms, two of which are complete with team rooms, equipment rooms, and a shared training room.

Prior to the opening of the arena, men's basketball played its home games primarily at Peterson Gymnasium (located across the street from Viejas Arena and the current home to the Aztec women's volleyball team), and, for more than 30 years, played on-and-off at the San Diego Sports Arena.

Jeff Jacobs JAM Center 
In 2015, the San Diego State Athletics Department opened an on-campus state-of-the-art practice facility, The Jeff Jacobs JAM Center, for the Aztec men's basketball and women's basketball teams.

Head coaches
As of the 2019 Media Guide

Through March 18th 2023.

Postseason

NCAA Division I tournament results
The Aztecs have appeared in the NCAA Division I tournament 15 times, with a combined record of 8–14.  They have reached the Sweet Sixteen three times, in 2011, 2014, and 2023. Additionally, at 30-2 and ranked in the Top 10 they were considered a virtual lock for the 2020 NCAA Tournament, which was canceled due to the coronavirus pandemic.

NCAA Tournament seeding history
The NCAA began seeding the tournament with the 1979 edition.

NIT results
The Aztecs have appeared in the National Invitation Tournament (NIT) six times, with a combined record of 8–6.

NCAA Division II tournament results
The Aztecs appeared in the NCAA Division II tournament three times, with a combined record of 5–3.

NAIA tournament results
The Aztecs have appeared in the NAIA tournament five times. Their combined record is 15–4. They were NAIA national champions in 1941.

Retired jerseys 

On January 16, 2020, the Aztecs announced that they would be retiring former small forward Kawhi Leonard's jersey 15 on February 1, 2020. Leonard is the first player in Aztecs history to have his jersey retired.

Team records

All-time record vs. current MWC teams

Official record (including any NCAA imposed vacates and forfeits) against all current MWC opponents as of the completion of the 2022–2023 season:

Through March 14th, 2023.

Career Leaders (DI Era)

As of the 2022-23 Media Guide

Single Season Leaders (DI Era)
(*) Lead conference

Single Game Leaders (DI Era)

Notable former players 
Several former Aztec men's basketball players have gone on to play in the NBA, play in other professional basketball leagues, or achieve significant notability outside of basketball.

See also
 San Diego Hall of Champions
 Breitbard Hall of Fame
 San Diego sports curse

References

External links